Alexandru Popovici may refer to:
 Alexandru Popovici (Moldovan footballer), Moldovan footballer
 Alexandru Adrian Popovici, Romanian footballer
 Alexandru Popovici (biologist)